The Gay Caballero is a 1940 American Western film directed by Otto Brower and starring Cesar Romero, Sheila Ryan and Robert Sterling.  It is an entry in The Cisco Kid series of Westerns.

Plot
In a case of mistaken identity, the Cisco Kid and his sidekick Gordito arrive in town only to learn that Cisco has been declared dead.  Even worse than that, before he died, Cisco was accused of having tried to steal Susan Wetherby's land.  Cisco must prove both his identity and his innocence.

Cast
Cesar Romero as The Cisco Kid
Sheila Ryan as Susan Wetherby
Robert Sterling as Billy Brewster
Chris-Pin Martin as Gordito
Janet Beecher as Kate Brewster
Edmund MacDonald as Joe Turner
Jacqueline Dalya as Carmelita
C. Montague Shaw as George Wetherby
Hooper Atchley as Sheriff McBride

External links
 
 

1940 films
American black-and-white films
Films directed by Otto Brower
1940 Western (genre) films
20th Century Fox films
American Western (genre) films
Adaptations of works by O. Henry
Cisco Kid
1940s American films
1940s English-language films